Skinner is an American auction house. It is one of the world's leading auction houses for antiques and fine art.  It is the only full-service auction house headquartered in New England.

History

Skinner was founded by dealer Robert W. Skinner, Jr. (1932-1984), who believed that New England, with its long history as an international arts center, was a fitting location for a world-class auction house.  The company began operations in the 1960s and was incorporated in 1971 in Bolton, Massachusetts.  Skinner’s Boston gallery opened in 1978. The company has seen steady growth, and in 2009, Skinner moved its headquarters to nearby Marlborough.

In March 2022, Skinner was acquired by Bonhams for an undisclosed sum. The new company will be called Bonhams Skinner.

Expert departments

Skinner’s appraisers regularly appear on the PBS-TV series, Antiques Roadshow, and other arts and culture programs.  Representing 20 specialty collecting areas, the appraisers are expert in the areas of American furniture & decorative arts, American & European paintings & prints, European furniture & decorative arts, fine ceramics, fine jewelry, 20th Century design, fine musical instruments, Asian Works of Art, Fine Judaica, Science, Technology & Clocks, Rare Books & Manuscripts, Fine Silver, Antique Motor Vehicles, American Indian & Ethnographic Art, Fine Wines, Oriental rugs & carpets, Textiles & Couture, Toys, Dolls & Collectibles, and Discovery.

Notable auctions

Skinner conducts more than 60 auctions and events each year and has achieved world-record prices for many pieces sold at auction. Fitz Henry Lane’s Manchester Harbor, a 24x36 inch oil painting, sold for $5.5 million in November 2004, a world record for the artist and the highest price ever at auction in New England.
 A rare and historically important previously undiscovered broadside copy of the United States Declaration of Independence sold in 2007 for $693,500. Another broadside copy printed in Exeter, New Hampshire in 1776 by Robert Luist Fowle sold for $380,000 on November 14, 2010.New Hampshire Gazette.
 A molded copper touring car with driver weather vane, made in Boston circa 1910, sold for $941,000 
 1958/63 Gibson Explorer Electric Guitar sold for $611,000 setting a world record price for a Gibson Guitar.

References

External links
 Official website

American auction houses
Companies based in Boston